Illya Vasylovych Marchenko (born 8 September 1987) is a Ukrainian professional tennis player. Marchenko turned professional in 2005 and had been playing at the Futures and Challengers level from 2005 to 2008. His career high in singles is World No. 49 achieved on 26 September 2016 and No. 268 in doubles achieved on 25 August 2014. On the ATP Tour, Marchenko reached the semifinals of Moscow in 2009, the 2010 St. Petersburg Open and Doha in 2016.

He is noted for his backhand, which he cites as his best shot. His favorite surface is hard courts.

Personal life
Illya began playing tennis at age seven. His father Vassili and mother Anna are both engineers. Has one older brother, Igor Marchenko, a manager and former ice skater who took part in the 1998 Winter Olympics. Growing up, he admired Lleyton Hewitt and Roger Federer. He has played doubles on the Futures level with fellow Ukrainian Artem Smirnov. He was coached by Orest Tereschuk from July 2009 till 2014 and by Tibor Toth from 2014. Marchenko also has a YouTube channel with close to 3,000 subscribers and 150,000 views where he posts tennis-related content.

Professional career

2005–2008
After turning pro in 2005, Marchenko mostly played on the ITF Futures circuit.

In 2006, he reached his first Futures final (Nigeria F5) and won his first futures title a week later (Nigeria F6). He then attempted to qualify for his first ATP World Tour event in Marseille, but lost in the first round of qualification to Jérémy Chardy.

In 2007, Marchenko reached his third Futures final (Belarus F2) before losing to Russian Mikhail Elgin. Again, attempting to qualify for the main draw of an ATP World Tour event, Marchenko lost in the second round of the Kremlin Cup qualifiers in Moscow, and the final round of the St. Petersburg Open qualifier a week later.

In 2008, Marchenko reached his fourth Futures final (Russia F2) before bowing out to Pavel Chekhov in the final. In May, Marchenko reached the semi-final of the Türk Telecom İzmir Cup Challenger in Turkey before losing to eventual champion Gilles Müller. This was his best Challenger performance to date.

In August 2008, however, Marchenko topped out his previous Challenger performances by reaching the final of the Bukhara Challenger in Uzbekistan before losing to hometown favorite Denis Istomin in 3 sets. Marchenko then closed out his year with solid performances in two Ukrainian Challengers, reaching the Quarterfinals and Semifinals in each, respectively. Marchenko played his first Davis Cup tie in 2008, winning his only rubber.

2009
In March, Marchenko played his first live rubber in Davis Cup after being selected as second singles man for the Ukrainian team in the tie versus Great Britain. Marchenko defeated Josh Goodall, Britain's first singles man in the absence of Andy Murray in straight sets. Ukraine went on to win the tie after claiming victory in the doubles rubber (contested by Sergiy Stakhovsky and Sergei Bubka for Ukraine and Ross Hutchins and Colin Fleming for Great Britain). Marchenko played the fifth dead rubber against Chris Eaton and lost.

Marchenko played his first ATP World Tour match in Marseille after winning 3 rounds of qualification. However, he lost to Mischa Zverev in 3 sets, despite winning the first set. In May, Marchenko reached the semifinal of the Fergana Challenger in Uzbekistan, before reaching the final of the Penza Cup Challenger in Russia (losing to Mikhail Kukushkin in the final).

In August, Marchenko won the Istanbul Challenger in Turkey, beating 4 players ranked inside the Top 200 best of the world, including Karol Beck (ranked #100 at the time). Marchenko beat Florian Mayer to win the title, the first Challenger title of his entire career (singles or doubles).

Marchenko attempted to qualify for the first time into the main draw of a Grand Slam at the 2009 US Open, but lost to Marco Chiudinelli in the final round of qualification.

In October, Marchenko won 6 matches in a row before losing to countryman Sergiy Stakhovsky in the semi-final of the Mons Challenger in Belgium. He followed his good form at the Kremlin Cup event in Moscow, Russia. After winning three rounds of qualification matches, Marchenko reached his second ever ATP World Tour main draw. He then beat Denis Istomin in his first match, Andrey Golubev in his second match, and Evgeny Korolev in his quarterfinal match to reach his first ATP World Tour semifinal. This run in Moscow was Marchenko's best ATP result thus far. However, he lost to Serbia's Janko Tipsarević. He then played at the 2009 St. Petersburg Open, where he won his first round match against 56th ranked Fabio Fognini. He lost to second seeded Victor Hănescu in the Round of 16.

In November, Marchenko reached his fourth ATP Challenger Tour final. At the 2009 edition of the Presidents Cup in Astana, Kazakhstan, after defeating Björn Phau in the semifinals of the indoor hardcourt tournament, Marchenko bowed out to Andrey Golubev.

2010
Marchenko started 2010 by qualifying for the 2010 Australian Open. In the first round he beat former world No. 1 Carlos Moyá, before falling to World No. 6 Nikolay Davydenko in the second round.
Marchenko then travelled to Zagreb in February 2010 and made it to the quarterfinals after defeating Simone Bolelli and Ivan Dodig before losing to Jürgen Melzer. The same month he also travelled to Marseille and qualified. After beating Ruben Bemelmans and Olivier Rochus he faced top-10 seed Jo-Wilfried Tsonga in the quarterfinals. He subsequently lost the match.

In March 2010 he qualified for the ATP World Tour Masters 1000 in Miami. He beat Paul-Henri Mathieu in the first round but was defeated by Tommy Robredo in the second round.
Much of the year was pretty much the same for Marchenko, just missing out in qualifying or bowing out in the first or second rounds of tournaments. In October he earned 90 ATP ranking points at the 2010 St. Petersburg Open after reaching the semifinals, losing to eventual champion Mikhail Kukushkin.

2011
Marchenko started the year 2011 ranked No. 81. He qualified for the 2011 Australian Open. He beat Rubén Ramírez Hidalgo in the first round, but was beaten in straight sets by World No. 5 Andy Murray in the second round.

2013
In Bogota at the 2013 Claro Open Colombia, Marchenko played a first round hard court match against Matteo Viola and lost 3–6, 6–2, 0–6. He had a total of 12 double faults. In the 2nd and 3rd sets, he had 13 second serves and double faulted on 9 of them. In the deciding set alone, he double faulted 6 out of 9 times when faced with a second serve.

2016: First top-10 win, US Open fourth round, Top 50 debut
Early 2016 marked a real boost in Marchenko's career. At the 2016 Qatar ExxonMobil Open he managed to defeat three top 50 players, including a first round win against the defending champion David Ferrer, much against all expectations. This also marked the first victory against a top-10 player of his career. He lost to second seed Rafael Nadal in the semifinals.

He lost in the first round of the 2016 Australian Open to Australian wildcard Omar Jasika, ranked No. 310. Marchenko beat Ivan Dodig in the first round of the 2016 US Open in four sets. Marchenko then beat Damir Džumhur in straight sets. Marchenko was leading opponent and 14th seed Nick Kyrgios 4–6, 6–1, 6–4 when Kyrgios retired with a hip injury. Marchenko then lost in four sets to third seed Stan Wawrinka in the fourth round, his best showing at a Grand Slam in his career. As a result he made his top 50 debut on 12 September 2016.

2020-2021: Tenth Challenger title 
After struggling for the entirety of the 2020 season, Marchenko was able to once again find success at the 2021 Biella Challenger Indoor in Italy. He defeated the fifth seed and former World No. 24 Martin Kližan in straight sets in the first round. In the quarterfinals he won a tight three-setter against fourth seed Lorenzo Giustino. In the semifinals he defeated the second seed Federico Gaio 7–5, 6–1. In the final, Marchenko upset the top seed and former World No. 1 Andy Murray 6–2, 6–4 to win his first ATP Challenger-level title since 2019.

Davis Cup
Marchenko made his Davis Cup debut in 2008 at the age of 21. During his time with the Ukrainian Davis Cup team, he posted a win–loss record of 17–13 in singles, 1–0 in doubles, and 18–13 overall.

Challenger and Futures finals

Singles: 22 (10 titles, 11 runner-ups, 1 not contested)

Doubles: 5 (3–2)

Grand Slam performance timeline

Current through the 2022 Australian Open.

2010 Wimbledon counts as 1 win, 0 loss. Gilles Simon received a walkover in round 2, after Marchenko withdrew because of a shoulder injury.

 This does not count as a Marchenko loss, nor a Simon win.

Top 10 wins per season

Notes

References

External links 

 
 
 
 
 
 

1987 births
Living people
Ukrainian male tennis players
People from Kamianske
Olympic tennis players of Ukraine
Tennis players at the 2016 Summer Olympics
Sportspeople from Dnipropetrovsk Oblast
21st-century Ukrainian people